A hydrogencarbonate indicator (hydrogencarbonate indicator) is a type of pH indicator that is sensitive enough to show a color change as the concentration of carbon dioxide gas in an aqueous solution increases. The indicator is used in photosynthesis and respiration experiments to find out whether carbon dioxide is being liberated. It is also used to test the carbon dioxide content during gaseous exchange of organisms. When the carbon dioxide content is higher than 0.04%, the initial red colour changes to yellow as the pH becomes more acidic. If the carbon dioxide content is lower than 0.04%, it changes from red to magenta and, in relatively very low carbon dioxide concentrations, to purple. Carbon dioxide, even in the concentrations found in exhaled air, will dissolve in the indicator to form carbonic acid, a weak acid, which will lower the pH and give the characteristic colour change. A colour change to purple during photosynthesis shows a reduction in the percentage of carbon dioxide and is sometimes inferred as production of oxygen, but there is not actually any direct evidence for it.

Great care must be taken to avoid acidic or alkaline contamination of the apparatus in such experiments, since the test is not directly specific to gases like carbon dioxide.

Composition 
Two solutions are prepared separately:
 Solution A: 0.02 g of thymol blue, 0.01 g cresol red and 2 mL of ethanol
 Solution B: 0.8 g of sodium bicarbonate, 7.48 g of potassium chloride and 90 mL of water
 Mix Solution A and B and mix 9 mL of the mixed solution to 1000 mL of distilled water.
 This method to determinate the concentration of bicarbonates and carbonates is also called "Magni's method."

Color Change

References

PH indicators